Andrew Guy Tyrie, Baron Tyrie,  (born 15 January 1957) is a British politician and former chair of the Competition and Markets Authority. A member of the Conservative Party, he was Member of Parliament (MP) for Chichester from 1997 to 2017. Tyrie was previously a special adviser at HM Treasury and chair of the Treasury Select Committee, having taken up the role on 10 June 2010. He was described by Donald Macintyre of The Independent in 2013 as "the most powerful backbencher in the House of Commons", and by The Economist as a liberal conservative.

Early life
Tyrie was born at Rochford, Essex, on 15 January 1957. He was educated at Felsted School and Trinity College, Oxford, where he read PPE, graduating in 1979. He then attended the College of Europe at Bruges, where he received a postgraduate Certificate of Advanced European Studies, followed by Wolfson College, Cambridge, where he obtained the degree of MPhil.

Tyrie worked at the group head office of BP from 1981 to 1983. From 1990 to 1991, he was a Fellow of Nuffield College, Oxford, then a senior economist at the European Bank for Reconstruction and Development from 1992 to 1997. Tyrie contested Houghton and Washington in 1992.

Parliamentary career

From 1997 to 2010
Tyrie was first elected as the Member of Parliament for Chichester at the 1997 general election when  Labour returned to government. Following the Conservative Party's second defeat to Labour at the 2001 general election, William Hague announced that he would stand down from the leadership role; Tyrie became Ken Clarke's campaign manager in the following leadership election. Clarke was successful in the final ballot of MPs, but was defeated by Iain Duncan Smith in the full membership vote. Tyrie refused to join the new leader's shadow cabinet due to ideological differences.

After Michael Howard succeeded Duncan Smith as Conservative leader, Tyrie served in his Shadow Cabinet as Shadow Financial Secretary to the Treasury between November 2003 and March 2004 and then as Shadow Paymaster General between March 2004 and May 2005.

In 2005, he became Founding Chairman of the All-Party Parliamentary Group on Extraordinary Rendition, a group of politicians in the British Parliament which examines the issue of extraordinary rendition and related issues. He has been a member of the Public Accounts Commission since 1997 and served on the 1922 Committee Executive between 2005 and 2006.

The Conservatives' third consecutive defeat following the 2005 election led Michael Howard to announce his resignation as party leader, triggering a leadership contest. Tyrie managed Ken Clarke's campaign, but was again unsuccessful – Clarke was eliminated in the first ballot. David Cameron went on to be elected leader. Tyrie did not join the shadow cabinet.

Tyrie is also a Council Member of the Centre for Policy Studies. He is a shareholder of the Veritas Asian Fund and Falcon Land Limited, and he sits on the Board of Directors of Rugby Estates. In his constituency, Tyrie has been involved locally, namely in supporting campaigns including the movement to prevent the Accident and Emergency Department at St Richard's Hospital from being downgraded.

Since 2010
On 10 June 2010, Tyrie was elected to chair the Treasury Select Committee, defeating  original favourite Michael Fallon to succeed John McFall. He was returned unopposed to the Treasury Select Committee chairmanship after the 2015 general election. Tyrie also represents the United Kingdom in the Inter-Parliamentary Union.

The Financial Times speculated in 2012: "One possible reason why Mr Tyrie is still on the backbenches is that he irritated David Cameron by challenging his climate change policies. Mr Cameron did not ask him to become a Minister after the 2010 election and his nickname in senior Tory circles is 'Andrew Tiresome.'"

In December 2015, Tyrie rebelled against the Cameron government by opposing its motion to join the US-coalition in carrying out airstrikes against ISIS. In the following month, at a meeting of the Liaison Committee, which he chaired, Tyrie clashed with Cameron over the Prime Minister's refusal to release details regarding the UK's involvement in the Syrian Civil War. At one point, Cameron exclaimed to Tyrie: "You don't know what you're talking about". Tyrie's questioning during the January 2016 session of the committee was described in The Guardian as a "one-man opposition". Tyrie, like Cameron, is a member of the Marylebone Cricket Club.

Tyrie was opposed to Brexit prior to the 2016 EU membership referendum.

Select committees

He has been a member of House of Commons select committees, including:

 1997–2001 Joint Committee on Consolidation, &c., Bills
 1997–2001 Public Administration Select Committee 
 2001–03 Treasury Select Committee
 2001–04 Treasury Sub-Committee
 2005–10 Constitutional Affairs Committee
 2006 Joint Committee on Conventions
 2009–10 Reform of the House of Commons Committee
 2009–17 Joint Committee on Tax Law Rewrite Bills 
 2009–17 Treasury Select Committee
 2010–17 Liaison Committee
 2012–17 Parliamentary Commission on Banking Standards

Post-parliamentary career

Tyrie stood down as a Member of Parliament in 2017, deciding not to stand as a candidate in the snap general election.

In April 2018, he was confirmed as the next Chair of the Competition and Markets Authority. In June 2020, Tyrie's departure from the role was announced, taking effect in September. It was reported that he had become frustrated by the limitations of the role. However it was later speculated that Tyrie had been forced to stand down by CBA board members who had opposed his reformist agenda.

Tyrie was created a Life Peer on 12 June 2018, taking the title Baron Tyrie, of Chichester in the County of West Sussex. He decided to sit in the House of Lords as a non-affiliated peer due to his role at the independent CMA.

Bibliography
Subsidiarity: As History and Policy (with Andrew Adonis, 1990)
Cautionary Tale of EMU: Some Mistakes, Some Remedies (1991)
The Prospects For Public Spending (1996)
Reforming the Lords: A Conservative Approach (1998)
Leviathan at Large: The New Regulator for the Financial Markets (with Martin McElwee, 2000)
Never Say Never: Common Sense on the Euro (2002)
Mr Blair's Poodle: An Agenda for Reviving the House of Commons (CPS, 2003)
Mr Blair's Poodle Goes to War: The House of Commons, Congress, Iraq (CPS, 2004)
Pruning The Politicians: The case for a smaller House of Commons (2005)
Greater Transparency for UK Retail Banking: A Proposal (2007)
Account Rendered (with Roger Gough and Stuart McCracken, 2011)

References

External links
 Contributor page at The Guardian
 TheyWorkForYou.com – Andrew Tyrie MP
 The Public Whip – Andrew Tyrie MP voting record
 Parliament.uk – Andrew Tyrie MP profile
 Index of articles he's written at Journalisted
 Debrett's People of Today

1957 births
Living people
People from Rochford
People educated at Alleyn Court School
People educated at Felsted School
Alumni of Trinity College, Oxford
Alumni of Wolfson College, Cambridge
College of Europe alumni
British special advisers
Life peers
Life peers created by Elizabeth II
Conservative Party (UK) MPs for English constituencies
UK MPs 1997–2001
UK MPs 2001–2005
UK MPs 2005–2010
UK MPs 2010–2015
UK MPs 2015–2017
Non-fiction environmental writers
Members of the Privy Council of the United Kingdom
Free Enterprise Group